The Symphony No. 1 in E flat major, Op. 20 by Louis Spohr was written and published in 1811 and first performed in April of that year.

Movements 

The symphony is divided into four movements with the following tempo markings:

Recordings 

The symphony has been recorded by Howard Griffiths and the NDR Radiophilharmonie, as well as Howard Shelley with the Orchestra della Svizzera Italiana. A recording by Alfred Walter and the Budapest Symphony Orchestra on the Naxos label is also available.

Notes

Compositions by Louis Spohr
Compositions in E-flat major